Modjadji Nature Reserve, also known as the Modjadji Cycad Reserve, is situated near Modjadjiskloof, Limpopo province, South Africa. It encloses two steep ridges that are densely forested with the cycad Encephalartos transvenosus, the population of which is estimated at 15,000 individuals.

Hiking along the trails in this nature reserve, it is common to encounter dassies, monkeys, bushpigs, impala, nyala, bushbuck and other antelope. The reserve has a picnic and barbecue area, information centre, and curio shop.

See also 
 Protected areas of South Africa
 
 Rain Queen

References

Nature reserves in South Africa